ʿAbd al-Ghanī ibn Ṭālib bin Ḥamāda ibn Ibrāhīm al-Ghunaymī al-Dimashqī al-Maydānī (عبد الغني الغنيمي الميداني الحنفي) was a jurist (faqīh) and legal theorist (uṣūlī) adhering to the Hanafi school as well as a traditionalist (muḥaddith) and grammarian (naḥwī). Born in 1222 AH in the Maydān neighborhood in southern Damascus, he was known for his vast knowledge and his eagerness to apply it. Just as the neighborhood of his birth still bears this name to this day, he too has become known popularly as al-Maydānī.

Teachers and students
After memorizing the Qurʾān, he studied with the greatest of the scholars in Damascus during that era. These included:
Shaykh ʿUmar al-Mujtahid al-Dimashqī
the Hanafi jurist Saʿīd al-Ḥalabī(subsequently al-Dimashqī)
the traditionalist and best known jurist of the Levant Shaykh Imām ʿAlā al-Dīn Ibn ʿAbidīn
Shafiʿī jurist ʿAbd al-Ghanī al-Saqaṭī
Hanafi jurist and author of Radd al-Muḥtār ʿalā al-Durar al-Mukhtār Sayyid Muḥammad Amīn ibn ʿĀbidīn. 
ʿAbd al-Raḥmān bin Muḥammad al-Kuzbarī al-Shafiʿī, author of al-Thabat.
Aḥmad Bībars
Ḥasan ibn Ibrāhīm al-Bayṭār, the Shafiʿī jurist of his era

Qualities

There were many poetic verses written in praise of him, which can be found in Ḥilya al-Bashar fī Tārikh al-Qarn al-Thālith ʿAshar  by Shaykh ʿAbd al-Razzāq al-Bayṭār. (See volume 2, pgs 867–870)

When riots between Muslims and Christians in 1277 AH/1860 CE broke out, he played a significant role in extinguishing the chaos and restoring order. He was described as being far from antagonism and tribalism due to his distance from the material world and his piety.

Many from the region of Shām and beyond studied with him, including ʿAllāma Imām Shaykh Ṭāhir al-Jazāʾiriī and Ustādh Saʿīd al-Shartūnī al-Lubnānī al-Naṣrānī.

Works
Shaykh al-Mayḍāni was not prolific in his writings, but he was certainly amongst the best in the works he did author. These include:

al-Lubāb fī Sharḥ al-Kitāb in Hanafi fiqh
- When al-Kitāb is mentioned amongst the Hanafis, the Mukhtaṣar of al-Qudurī is intended. Imam al-Qudūrī was the Hanafi jurist and traditionist, Abū al-Ḥusayn Aḥmad ibn Muḥammad al-Qudūrī al-Baghdādī. It is with him the leadership of the Hanafis in Iraq comes to an end. He was born in 362 AH and died in 428 AH. He was also one of the teachers of al-Ḥāfiẓ al-Khaṭīb al-Baghdādī, the author of  Tārīkh Baghdād.

This Mukhtaṣar is considered to be one of the reliable books within the Hanafi school, used by adherents of the school into the present day. For this reason Shaykh al-Mayḍanī undertook the task of writing a commentary on it and elucidating its contents. He sought to relate the chosen and established legal positions. This book was widely accepted during his lifetime and after his death. He finished writing it on the 13th of Ramadan in 1266 AH according to the most sound report. However, Ismaʿīl Bāshā al-Baghdādī in Hadiyya al-ʿĀrifīn and Sarkīs in Muʿjam al-Maṭbūʿāt opine that the year was 1267 AH.

This book's first edition was first published during the lifetime of the author in Qasṭanṭaniya/Asātina, modern-day Istanbul,  in the year 1274–1275. Thereafter, numerous editions were printed. Unfortunately, many of those printed in Egypt are filled with errors except those proofread by Ustādh Muḥammad Muḥyī al-Dīn ʿAbd al-Ḥamīd.

Shaykh ʿAbdul Fattāh notes that he spent time in Damascus on 20 Muharram 1378 to review all of the manuscripts of Shaykh al-Maydānī. These included:

 Sharḥ al-Marāh fī al-Ṣarf, 133 pgs min al-qaṭʿi al-wasaṭ
 Sharḥ ʿAqīda al-Imām al-Ṭaḥāwī, 100 pgs
 Kashf al-Iltibās ʿammā awradahū al-Imām al-Bukhārī ʿalā Baʿḍ al-Nās, 35 pgs. Edited and published by Shaykh Abdul Fattāh Abū Ghudda

Death
Al-Maydānī died in the year 1298 of the Hijra calendar.

Notes

Hanafis
Maturidis
19th-century Muslim theologians
Syrian jurists
1800s births
1880s deaths
Year of birth unknown
Year of death unknown